Romance of the Rio Grande (also: En kärleksnatt vid Rio Grande) is a 1929 American pre-Code Western film directed by Alfred Santell and starring Warner Baxter, Mona Maris, Mary Duncan and Antonio Moreno. It was produced and distributed by the Fox Film Corporation in both a Movietone talking version and also a silent version.

Cast
 Warner Baxter as Pablo Wharton Cameron
 Mona Maris as Manuelita
 Mary Duncan as Carlotta
 Antonio Moreno as Juan
 Robert Edeson as Don Fernando
 Agostino Borgato as Vincente
 Albert Roccardi as Padre Miguel
 Charles Byer as Dick Rivers
 Majel Coleman as Dorry Wayne
 Merrill McCormick as Luca

References

External links
 Romance of the Rio Grande @ IMDb.com
 

1929 films
1929 Western (genre) films
American black-and-white films
Films based on American novels
Films directed by Alfred Santell
Fox Film films
Silent American Western (genre) films
Transitional sound Western (genre) films
1920s American films